Jaroslav Vítek (14 January 1915 – 15 May 1966) was a Czechoslovak athlete. He was specialized in shot put and also competed in discus throwing.

He represented Czechoslovakia at the 1938 European Athletics Championships in Paris in the shot put event finishing sixth with a distance of 14.77 metres. He also competed in the discus throw event finishing 14th with a throw of 41.18 metres.

His discus throw personal best was 15.38 metres, thrown in 1939.

References

External links
 

1915 births
1966 deaths
Czechoslovak male discus throwers
Czechoslovak male shot putters
People from Prostějov District
Sportspeople from the Olomouc Region